Falk Huste (born November 6, 1971 in Greiz, Thüringen) is a boxer from Germany, who won the bronze medal in the Men's Featherweight (– 57 kg) division at the 2000 European Amateur Boxing Championships in Tampere, Finland. He is the older brother of boxer Kay Huste, and a two-time medalist at the World Amateur Boxing Championships.

Huste represented his native country at the 2000 Summer Olympics in Sydney, Australia. There he was stopped in the second round of the Men's Featherweight division by United States's eventual silver medalist Ricardo Juarez. He also competed at the 1996 Summer Olympics in Atlanta, Georgia.

References
 sports-reference

1971 births
Living people
People from Greiz
Featherweight boxers
Boxers at the 1996 Summer Olympics
Boxers at the 2000 Summer Olympics
Olympic boxers of Germany
German male boxers
AIBA World Boxing Championships medalists
Sportspeople from Thuringia